KRWN (92.5 FM) is a radio station with a classic rock format.  It is licensed to Farmington, New Mexico serving the Four Corners area.

KRWN started out as a top 40 radio station.  It then moved to an active rock, then to mainstream rock format.  In the 2010s the station transitioned to classic rock as competitor KDAG took KRWNs active rock selections.  Through the format changes KRWN remained the mass appeal radio station for the four corners.

According to its website, it is the top-rated station in the area according to an audience survey taken in the fall of 2005.

External links
Official website

RWN